Melvins vs. Minneapolis is a nine-disc live album by American rock band the Melvins, released in 2008 via Amphetamine Reptile Records and Burlesque of North America Records, and has been recorded across a five-year period, from 2000 to 2006.

Track listing

Disc 1
Let It All Be
Lovely Butterfly
Manky
Hooch
Youth of America
Night Goat
With Teeth
Tipping the Lion
Queen
Promise Me
Black Stooges
The Fool, The Meddling Idiot (Pt. 1)
The Fool, The Meddling Idiot (Pt. 2)

Recorded at Grumpy's Bar (Downtown) on March 20, 2004.

Disc 2
Intro (featuring David Scott Stone)
Pigs of the Roman Empire (featuring Lustmord)
Amazon
Amazon
The Bloated Pope
Let It All Be
Hooch
Black Stooges
At the Stake
Shevil
Hung Bunny
Roman Dog Bird

Recorded at the Walker Art Center on March 24, 2006.

Disc 3
Missing
Snake Appeal
Okie from Muskogee
Tipping the Lion
Promise Me
At the Stake
Lovely Butterfly
With Yo' Heart, Not Yo' Hands
Adolescent Wet Dream
Halo of Flies
Tequila
Night Goat
Wispy
Revulsion / We Reach
Let It All Be
Revolve
Amazon
Amazon
Cherub
The Bit
Youth of America
Tequila

Recorded at Grumpy's Bar & Grill on September 18, 2000.

Disc 4
Intro
Tequila
Okie from Muskogee
Missing
Snake Appeal
Tipping the Lion
Promise Me
At the Stake
Lovely Butterfly
With Yo' Heart, Not Yo' Hands
Adolescent Wet Dream
Halo of Flies
Let It All Be
Revolve
Night Goat
Wispy / Revulsion / We Reach
Cherub
The Bit
Youth of America

Recorded at Grumpy's Bar & Grill on September 19, 2000.

Disc 5
Intro / Black Stooges
Oven
Anaconda
Ballad of Dwight Fry / Halo of Flies
At the Stake
Let It All Be
The Bit
Manky
It's Shoved

Recorded at Grumpy's on October 15, 2001.

Disc 6
Intro / Oven
Anaconda / Intro (Broken String)
Halo of Flies
Anaconda
At The Stake
Let It All Be
Night Goat (Pt. 1)
Night Goat (Pt. 2)
Cherub
The Bit
Amazon
Amazon
With Teeth
It's Shoved
Snake Appeal

Recorded at Grumpy's on October 16, 2001.

Disc 7
Intro
The Anti-Vermin Seed
With Teeth
Night Goat
Revolve
We all Love JUDY
The Brain Center at Whipples
Let It All Be
The Fool, The Meddling Idiot
Hooch
Mombius Hibachi
Promise Me
Foaming
Black Stooges (First Half)
Black Stooges (Second Half)

Disc 8
Recorded at Grumpy's on February 9, 2003.

Let It All Be
Lovely Butterfly
Homosexuality Song
Hooch
With Teeth
Tipping the Lion
Queen
Promise Me
Black Stooges
It's Shoved
Halo of Flies

Recorded at Grumpy's (Coon Rapids) on March 19, 2004.

Disc 9
Noise Intro (featuring David Scott Stone)
Pigs of the Roman Empire (featuring Lustmord)
Amazon
Amazon
The Bloated Pope
Let It All Be
Hooch
Joan of Arc
Happy Birthday / Black Stooges (Drum Intro)
At the Stake
Shevil

Recorded at Grumpy's Bar (Downtown) on March 25, 2006.

2008 live albums
Melvins live albums
Burlesque of North America Records albums
Amphetamine Reptile Records live albums